The 1992 Hockey East Men's Ice Hockey Tournament was the 8th Tournament in the history of the conference. It was played between March 6 and March 14, 1992. Quarterfinal games were played at home team campus sites, while the final four games were played at the Boston Garden in Boston, Massachusetts, the home venue of the NHL's Boston Bruins. By winning the tournament, Maine received the Hockey East's automatic bid to the 1992 NCAA Division I Men's Ice Hockey Tournament.

Format
The tournament featured three rounds of play with each round being a single-elimination game. In the first round, the first and eighth seeds, the second and seventh seeds, the third seed and sixth seeds, and the fourth seed and fifth seeds played with the winners advancing to the semifinals. In the semifinals, the highest and lowest seeds and second highest and second lowest seeds play with the winners advancing to the championship game. The tournament champion receives an automatic bid to the 1992 NCAA Division I Men's Ice Hockey Tournament.

Conference standings
Note: GP = Games played; W = Wins; L = Losses; T = Ties; PTS = Points; GF = Goals For; GA = Goals Against

Bracket

Teams are reseeded after the quarterfinals

Note: * denotes overtime period(s)

Quarterfinals

(1) Maine vs. (8) Merrimack

(2) New Hampshire vs. (7) Northeastern

(3) Providence vs. (6) Massachusetts-Lowell

(4) Boston University vs. (5) Boston College

Semifinals

(1) Maine vs. (5) Boston College

(2) New Hampshire vs. (3) Providence

Championship

(1) Maine vs. (2) New Hampshire

Tournament awards

All-Tournament Team
F Domenic Amodeo (New Hampshire)
F Jim Montgomery (Maine)
F Scott Pellerin* (Maine)
D Rob Gaudreau (Providence)
D Chris Imes (Maine)
G Jeff Levy (New Hampshire)
* Tournament MVP(s)

References

External links
Hockey East Online

Hockey East Men's Ice Hockey Tournament
HE tournament